Cogliate is a comune (municipality) in the Province of Monza and Brianza in the Italian region Lombardy, located  northwest of Milan. 
  
Cogliate borders the following municipalities: Lentate sul Seveso, Rovello Porro, Misinto, Barlassina, Seveso, Saronno, Cesano Maderno, Ceriano Laghetto.

References

External links
 Official website